Saint-Yrieix-sous-Aixe is a commune in the Haute-Vienne department in the Nouvelle-Aquitaine region in west-central France.

The writer Jean Colombier, winner of the 1990 edition of the Prix Renaudot was born in Saint-Yrieix-sous-Aixe in 1945.

See also
Communes of the Haute-Vienne department
List of works by Henri Chapu

References

Communes of Haute-Vienne